The following is the result of the World Weightlifting Championships tournaments in year 1910.

Tournament 1
The first tournament (13th World Weightlifting Championships) was held in Düsseldorf, Germany from June 4 to June 6, 1910. There were 57 men in action from 5 nations.

Tournament 2
The fourth tournament (14th World Weightlifting Championships) was held in Vienna, Austria-Hungary from October 9 to October 10, 1910. There were 15 men in action from 2 nations.

Medal table

References
Results
Weightlifting World Championships Seniors Statistics

External links
International Weightlifting Federation

World Weightlifting Championships
World Weightlifting Championships
World Weightlifting Championships
World Weightlifting Championships